The Ninety-Fifth Wisconsin Legislature convened from January 30, 2001, to May 15, 2002, in regular session, and held a concurrent special session from January 22, 2002, through July 8, 2002.

Senators representing even-numbered districts were newly elected for this session and were serving the first two years of a four-year term.  Assembly members were elected to a two-year term.  Assembly members and even-numbered senators were elected in the general election of November 7, 2000.  Senators representing odd-numbered districts were serving the third and fourth year of their four-year term, having been elected in the general election held on November 3, 1998.

Major events
 January 20, 2001: Inauguration of George W. Bush as 43rd President of the United States.
 September 11, 2001: September 11 attacks destroyed the World Trade Center and damaged The Pentagon.
 October 1, 2001: Start of Operation Enduring Freedom.
 October 7, 2001: United States invasion of Afghanistan initiated the War in Afghanistan.
 May 30, 2002: A three-judge panel of two U.S. district judges and one Circuit Judge of the United States Seventh Circuit issue an opinion in Baumgart v. Wendelberger which directed a legislative redistricting of Wisconsin based on the 2000 United States census to be utilized in the 2002 elections.

Party summary

Senate summary

Assembly summary

Sessions
 Regular session: January 30, 2001May 15, 2002
 January 2002 Special session: January 22, 2002July 8, 2002

Officers

Senate 
 President: Fred Risser (D)
 President pro tempore: Gary R. George (D)

Majority Leadership 
 Majority Leader: Charles Chvala (D)
 Assistant Majority Leader: Rodney C. Moen (D)
 Majority Caucus Chair: Judy Robson (D)

Minority Leadership 
 Minority Leader: Mary Panzer (R)
 Assistant Minority Leader: Margaret Farrow (R) (until May 9, 2001)
 After May 9, 2001: Alan Lasee (R)
 Minority Caucus Chair: David Zien (R)
 Minority Caucus Vice Chair: Carol Roessler (R)

Assembly 
 Speaker: Scott Jensen (R)
 Speaker pro tempore: Stephen Freese  (R)

Majority Leadership 
 Majority Leader: Steven Foti (R)
 Assistant Majority Leader: Bonnie Ladwig (R)
 Majority Caucus Chair: Daniel P. Vrakas (R)

Minority Leadership 
 Minority Leader: Shirley Krug (D) (until May 1, 2001)
 After May 1, 2001: Spencer Black (D)
 Assistant Minority Leader: Spencer Black (D) (until May 1, 2001)
 After May 1, 2001: James Kreuser (D)
 Minority Caucus Chair: Peter Bock (D)

Members

Senate members
Members of the Senate for the 95th Wisconsin Legislature:

Assembly members
Members of the Assembly for the 95th Wisconsin Legislature:

Notes

References

External links

Wisconsin legislative sessions
2000s in Wisconsin